The 2019 PCCL National Collegiate Championship is the eleventh edition of the Philippine Collegiate Champions League (PCCL) in its current incarnation, the postseason tournament to determine the national collegiate champions in basketball. The tournament will be the 16th edition overall.

Due to the adjustments done in the schedules of most collegiate basketball tournaments due to the Philippines' hosting of the 2019 Southeast Asian Games, the National Collegiate Championship commenced in February 2020.

Tournament format
The tournament format was unveiled in November 2019.
Qualifying round
UAAP–NCAA Challenge
2 teams from the University Athletic Association of the Philippines (UAAP)
2 teams from the National Collegiate Athletic Association (NCAA)
Luzon qualifiers
1 team from University Athletic Association of the Philippines (UAAP)
1 team from NCR
1 team from North/Central Luzon
1 team from South Luzon/Bicol
Visayas/Mindanao qualifiers
2 teams from Cebu Schools Athletic Foundation, Inc. (CESAFI)
1 team from Visayas
3 teams from Mindanao
Final round
Luzon qualifiers winner
Visayas/Mindanao qualifiers winner
top two teams from UAAP–NCAA challenge

Qualifying teams

UAAP–NCAA Challenge

Luzon

Visayas/Mindanao

Qualifying rounds 
All times are local (UTC+8).

UAAP–NCAA Challenge qualifiers

Luzon qualifiers

Visayas/Mindanao qualifiers

Final four

Bracket

Semifinals

Third place

Final

Awards 
Most Valuable Player: 
Mythical Five:

Lassina Coulibaly

Notes

References

2019
2019–20 in Philippine basketball leagues